The Nissan Crew is a mid-size sedan manufactured by Nissan, sold only in Japan and mostly used as taxicabs, driver training, and by law enforcement agencies as police cars. Its FR layout and simple construction created a steady following converting Crews into drifting and tuning cars.

Its main competitor was the Toyota Comfort. An indication of its intended market as a taxi is that the b-pillar is set  further forward on the passenger (left) side, making the driver's side door and the left rear door larger than the others since these two would see the majority of use. The rear left door was also available with power opening.

History
Production of the Nissan Crew (K30) started at Nissan Shatai in July 1993. While the majority of Crews were used as taxis, a civilian model was available between 1994 and 2002 known as "Crew Saloon". The Crew used a body pan derived from the Y31 Nissan Cedric, although the front end was mostly borrowed from the C32 Laurel. The Crew Saloon, aimed at private buyers (but still available with a power rear door) was built between January 1994 and June 2002. The Crew taxi was built until August 2009, with a total of 52,124 cars sold.

Autech has been involved in modifying Crews for paratransit taxi (福祉タクシー) models where the front passenger seat may rotate to allow a disabled passenger to sit in front.

Models
In addition to taxi models, there were also special paratransit models, driving school models, patrol cars, and other specialty vehicles available.

The typical engine was the LPG-powered NA20P, but the RD28 diesel was also available (E-L and GLX). Police and driver training cars were also offered with the RB20E engine. Equipment levels started with the very spartan E, followed by the E-L, GL, and GLX. While the E and E-L were mostly sold to taxi companies, the GL and GLX targeted owner-operators. As such, they were available with body-colored bumpers, chrome trim, aluminium wheels and other comfort and appearance items.

Saloon
Introduced in January 1994, the Crew Saloon was aimed at private buyers rather than institutional and commercial use. The range consisted of the LS Saloon-F, LS Saloon, LX Saloon and the more expensive LX Saloon G Type. At the time of introduction, there was also a somewhat lower cost B Type model of the LX Saloon, but this was discontinued in February 1995 when the G Type was introduced. Most Crew Saloons were equipped with the 2-liter six-cylinder RB20E engine, but the RD28 diesel was also available (only on the LX Saloon and the later LX Saloon G Type). Sales targets at the time of introduction were 300 per month of the gasoline model, and 50 per month for the diesels; this had dropped to 200 per month of all models by 1995 and to 100 per month by 1998. In August 1999, the LS models were dropped from the lineup.

Galue I
The Crew forms the basis for the Galue sedan by Mitsuoka, produced from 1996 to 2001. It shares the same RB20E engine and the design was inspired by the Rolls-Royce Silver Cloud II. It was originally sold simply as the Galue, but after the introduction of the Cedric-based Galue II in 1999 the original model became the Galue I to help keep them apart.

Specifications

Engines
In August 1999, the diesel engine was upgraded to the 18-valve, electronically controlled RD28E unit with  but it was no longer offered on the GLX model. In April 1994, three months after the introduction of the RB20E in the Crew Saloon, this engine was also installed in the patrol car (a six-cylinder engine was generally required for patrol cars) and then to the driving school cars. In June 2002, the gasoline and diesel options were discontinued, leaving only the LPG-powered NA20P and marking the end of the patrol car as well as the Crew Saloon.

It's mated to either a 4-speed automatic transmission or a 5-speed manual transmission. Introduced in January 1994, only the RB20E was on offer at first. In May 1994, the diesel engine became available, initially only on the LX Saloon model. The diesel engine produces the same power in the Saloon as in the commercial models, and was also upgraded to the RD28E in August 1999. The Crew Saloon was discontinued in June 2002.

Gallery

References

External links

Official Nissan Crew website

1990s cars
2000s cars
Mid-size cars
Sedans
Crew
Taxi vehicles
Police vehicles